Ballyea is a small village in County Clare, Ireland, located southwest of Ennis.The village has a primary school, community centre, Catholic church and GAA facilities.

Sports
Ballyea GAA is the local Gaelic Athletic Association club, and is mainly involved in hurling. In the 2016 season, Ballyea won their first ever Clare Senior Hurling Championship and also went on to win the Munster Senior Club Hurling Championship.

Notable people
 Tony Kelly - GAA-GPA Hurler of the Year in 2013.

References

External links
 Ballyea GAA

Towns and villages in County Clare